Berberis lechleriana is a species of plant in the family Berberidaceae. It is endemic to Ecuador.

References

Endemic flora of Ecuador
lechleriana
Data deficient plants
Taxonomy articles created by Polbot